Pseudomyas is a genus of ground beetles in the family Carabidae. This genus has a single species, Pseudomyas doramasensis. It is found in the Canary Islands.

References

Platyninae